There are two lists of Polish language films:
Alphabetical by Polish title
Alphabetical by title of English release

Alphabetical by Polish title 

 Austeria
 Bilans kwartalny
 Człowiek na torze
 Człowiek z Marmuru
 Człowiek z Żelaza
 Dekalog
 Dług
 Eroica
 Faraon
 Golem
 Jak być kochaną
 Kanał
 Klincz
 Lotna
 Miś
 Nóż w wodzie
 Ogniem i Mieczem

 Ostatni dzień lata
 Pan Wołodyjowski
 Pasażerka
 Pianista
 Pociąg
 Pokolenie
 Popiół i Diament
  Potop
 Pożegnania
 Pręgi
 Przez dotyk
 Quo Vadis
 Rejs
 Rękopis znaleziony w Saragossie 
 Sanatorium Pod Klepsydrą
 Seksmisja
 Trzy Kolory: Bialy
 Zemsta
 Ziemia Obiecana

Alphabetical by title of English release 

 Ashes and Diamonds
 Austeria
 Blind Chance
 By Touch
 Camera Buff
 Colonel Wolodyjowski
 The Cruise
 The Debt
 Dekalog
  The Deluge
 The Double Life of Véronique 
 Farewells
 A Generation
 Heroism
 The Hour-Glass Sanatorium 
 How to Be Loved
 Kanal
 Knife in the Water
 Korczak

 The Last Day of Summer
 Lotna
 Man of Iron
 Man of Marble
 Man on the Tracks
 Night Train
 No End
 The Passenger
 Pharaoh
 The Pianist
 The Promised Land
 The Revenge
 The Saragossa Manuscript 
 Sexmission
 A Short Film About Killing
 A Short Film About Love
 Teddy Bear
 Three Colors: White
 A Woman's Decision

See also
List of Polish films
Polish film school

Polish language films
 
Polish